Bryan Cunningham is the head men's soccer coach at the Mount St. Mary's University. He is restarting a program that had been dormant since 2012 and will return to competition in 2018.

He had been head coach at the University of Central Florida since 2007. His 2007 team tied a school record with 3 conference wins, and set a school mark with its highest positioning in Conference USA at 3rd. From 2005 to 2007, he was an assistant coach at UCF, and was the head recruiting coordinator at the school. He also served as an assistant coach at Appalachian State University, and the University of South Carolina. He played college soccer at Pfeiffer University where he was a three-time captain.

References

External links
https://web.archive.org/web/20100418185208/http://ucfathletics.cstv.com/sports/m-soccer/mtt/cunningham_bryan00.html

Appalachian State Mountaineers men's soccer coaches
South Carolina Gamecocks men's soccer coaches
UCF Knights men's soccer coaches
Living people
Sportspeople from Allentown, Pennsylvania
Year of birth missing (living people)
Pfeiffer Falcons men's soccer players
Mount St. Mary's Mountaineers men's soccer coaches
Association football midfielders
American soccer coaches
American soccer players
Soccer players from Pennsylvania